In Hinduism, the Rainbow Fish was a legend about a fish that was as large as a whale. It ate Buddha, an incarnation of the deity Vishnu, but then was caught and killed by fishermen who freed Buddha from its stomach. After the Rainbow Fish was caught, it provided an entire nation with food for a year.

The scales of the rainbow fish were red, blue, green, and yellow, which represented the classical elements. The green scales were made of grass, representing the element Earth or Prithvi. The blue scales were ice, which represented the water element or Jal. The yellow scales were lightning, representing air or Vayu. The red scales were made of fire, representing the fire element or Agni.

References 

Hindu legendary creatures
Legendary fish